Lifes Rich Pageant is the fourth studio album by the American alternative rock band R.E.M., released on July 28, 1986. R.E.M. chose Don Gehman to produce the album, which was recorded at John Mellencamp's Belmont Mall Studios in Belmont, Indiana. This was the only album the band recorded with Gehman, who moved them from the more obscure and dense sound of their earlier albums to an accessible, hard rock-influenced quality. The album was well-received critically.

Details
The album title is based on an English idiom. Its use is very old, but R.E.M.'s use is, according to guitarist Peter Buck, from the 1964 film A Shot in the Dark, minus the apostrophe:

Inspector Clouseau opens a car door, falling into a fountain.
Maria: "You should get out of these clothes immediately. You'll catch your death of pneumonia, you will."
Clouseau: "Yes, I probably will. But it's all part of life's rich pageant, you know?"

The cover of the album is a photograph of drummer Bill Berry on the upper part of the cover and a pair of bison, signifying an environmental theme, on the lower part. It also alludes to Buffalo Bill.

With R.E.M.'s fan base beginning to grow beyond its college rock boundaries, Lifes Rich Pageant proved at the time to be the band's most commercially successful album in the United States, peaking at number 21 on the Billboard charts and heralding the band's first gold record. In the UK, the album managed a number 43 peak.

Slant Magazine listed the album at #52 on its list of "Best Albums of 1980s" saying "Lifes Rich Pageant stands as a nearly seamless transition between the band's formative period and their commercial dominance."

In 2000, it ranked at number 162 in the list of Virgin's All-Time Album Top 1000 List.

The ecologically conscious "Fall on Me" (a personal favorite of frontman Michael Stipe) and a cover of the Clique's "Superman", sung by bassist Mike Mills, were the only singles released from the album (the single version of the latter removed the sample from one of the Godzilla movies that began the album version).

Another ecologically minded song, "Cuyahoga", refers to the once heavily polluted Cuyahoga River that flows into Lake Erie at Cleveland, Ohio. The song includes the lyric we burned the river down, which refers to the several occasions (most famously in 1969) when the river actually caught fire.

At the end of "Just a Touch" Michael Stipe can be heard screaming the line "I'm so young, I'm so goddamn young", quoting  longtime influence Patti Smith's live cover version of The Who's "My Generation"  released on the b-side of her 1976 single "Gloria", which she also uses at the end of her cover version of "Privilege (Set Me Free)" from her 1978 album Easter.

Recording and production 
During the first half of 1986, the band took a break from touring to recover energy. They wanted to make a change from the sound of their previous album, with Mills saying "We wanted to get away from the sort of murky feelings and sounds that we got out of Joe in London". They wanted a "really hard-driving record, but we also like to throw in a lot of things: pianos and organs and accordions and banjos and what-not" and considered working with Gehman as they liked the acoustic sound of his work with John Mellencamp. They initially met for an extensive demo session at John Keane's Studio in Athens, Georgia, in March 1986 (These recordings would later be released as the "Athens Demos" on the 25th anniversary re-release of the album). After being initially skeptical, they embraced the new recording process with Gehman later stating that:"I liked to spend time on the arrangement and layer in the overdubs and comp the vocals—all this process which, to me, was normal record-making, they had never been through before. When they saw that kind of record-making process didn't take anything away—that it actually added another level of artistic expression—they were very excited by it."The album was recorded at John Mellencamp's Belmont Mall Recording Studios in Belmont, Indiana, in April and May 1986. The recording studio was larger and had newer technology than they were used to, and they enjoyed the town, attending many concerts while there. The band were also happy with the production of the record and the extra clarity of the vocals:"Don (Gehman, the album's producer) is good at layering things so there can be a lot of things going on but you can still hear everything. And as far as Michael's vocals go, it's a combination of things: Michael is getting better at what he's doing, and he's getting more confident at it. And I think that shows up in the projection of his voice. The overall sound of everything was so good, we didn't mind having the vocals mixed as loud as they were." - Mike Mills

Reception

The 25th anniversary re-release of  PopMatters included it in their list of the "12 Essential 1980s Alternative Rock Albums".

Anthony DeCurtis, writing a contemporary review for Rolling Stone called it "brilliant and groundbreaking, if modestly flawed", praising it as "the most outward looking record R.E.M. has made." It "carries on...the dark Southern folk artistry of last year’s Fables of the Reconstruction" and "paints a swirling, impressionistic portrait of a country at the moral crossroads". Robert Christgau gave the album B+ in a dismissive review that complained of a lack of progress from earlier albums.

Retrospective reviews of the album in the context of the band's later work have been positive. Gavin Edwards, writing in 2003, gave it four stars, praising Fall on Me in particular as "the finest song in the R.E.M. canon. A lullaby of modern anxiety, it's flexible enough to serve as a potent metaphor for acid rain, nuclear warfare, satellite surveillance or any other modern phobia you choose". Stephen Deusner, writing for Pitchfork calls it "invigorating", citing it as R.E.M.'s first transition album, simultaneously their "most pop-oriented and accessible album up to that point" and "most overtly political collection, with songs addressing environmental crises and political malaise". Alexis Petridis of The Guardian says it "may represent the band at their absolute zenith... imbued with a swaggering confidence absent from its murky predecessor". Petridis also singles out Fall on Me for its "beautiful opacity" and the "sumptuousness of its melody". Andrew Mueller in Uncut argues that it represents R.E.M. embracing the mainstream: "For the first time, it had occurred to REM that they had a constituency – and, indeed, that it might be possible and desirable to build on that" with an album where "Every note... fizzes and crackles with the urgency of people who’ve made their minds up"

Both DeCurtis and Deusner praise the production work of Don Gehman, comparing it favorably with their previous album Fables of the Reconstruction. DeCurtis said Gehman "has done an outstanding job of hardening R.E.M.’s sonic jolt" while Deusner stated that Gehman succeeded by "giving the melodic leads their own space, he emphasizes the muscle in Berry's beats and the intricate interaction between the rhythm section".

Track listing
All songs written by Bill Berry, Peter Buck, Mike Mills and Michael Stipe, except where noted.

Side one – "Dinner side"
"Begin the Begin" – 3:28
"These Days" – 3:24
"Fall on Me" – 2:50
"Cuyahoga" – 4:19
"Hyena" – 2:50
"Underneath the Bunker" (unlisted on packaging) – 1:25

Side two – "Supper side"
"The Flowers of Guatemala" – 3:55
"I Believe" – 3:49
"What If We Give It Away?" – 3:33
"Just a Touch" – 3:00
"Swan Swan H" – 2:42
"Superman" (Mitchell Bottler and Gary Zekley) (unlisted on packaging) – 2:52

1993 I.R.S. Vintage Years reissue bonus tracks
"Tired of Singing Trouble" – 0:59
Previously unreleased
"Rotary Ten" – 1:58
B-side of "Fall on Me" American 7" single
"Toys in the Attic" (Steve Tyler, Joe Perry) – 2:26
B-side of "Fall on Me" British 12" single
"Just a Touch" (Live in studio) – 2:38
Previously unreleased version, recorded live to 2-track during Reckoning sessions, 1984
"Dream (All I Have to Do)" (Felice and Boudleaux Bryant) – 2:38
Originally released on the soundtrack to the film Athens, GA: Inside Out, 1987
"Swan Swan H" (Acoustic version) – 2:41
Originally released on the soundtrack to the film Athens, GA: Inside Out, 1987

Notes
"Rotary Ten" and "Toys in the Attic" can be found on Dead Letter Office.
Although sometimes referred to as such, the first release of this edition does not have the original tracks remastered. They follow the first print of the album and only add the extra tracks.

2011 25th Anniversary Edition reissue bonus tracks (The Athens Demos)
 "Fall on Me" – 2:50
 "Hyena" – 2:50
 "March Song" ("King of Birds" demo) – 3:46
 "These Days" – 3:36
 "Bad Day" – 3:26
 "Salsa" ("Underneath the Bunker" demo) – 1:32
 "Swan Swan H" – 2:39
 "The Flowers of Guatemala" – 3:29
 "Begin the Begin" – 3:44
 "Cuyahoga" – 4:33
 "I Believe" – 3:37
 "Out of Tune" – 0:34
 "Jazz" ("Rotary Ten" demo) – 1:13
 "Two Steps Onward" – 4:24
 "Just a Touch" – 2:31
 "Mystery to Me" – 2:07
 "Wait" – 2:10
 "All the Right Friends" – 3:40
 "Get On Their Way" ("What If We Give It Away?" demo) – 3:17

Notes
"Superman" was listed on some early UK CD copies as "Superwoman."
The track listing on the back of the album is incorrect. It has never been corrected. The order is given as 1-5-10-8-2-7-4-9-3-11, which leaves out "Superman" and "Underneath the Bunker."  The track listing is correct on the actual vinyl, cassette, and some CD versions.
Early American pressings of the CD have the track number for "Cuyahoga" as "0R" instead of "04" printed on the disc itself. This error resurfaces on the cover of Green.
On the vinyl and cassette releases, R.E.M. labeled side one (tracks 1–6) as the "Dinner side" and side two (tracks 7–12) as the "Supper side."
The European 'I.R.S. Years Vintage 1986' release preserves the erroneous track list, but properly lists the bonus tracks.

Personnel
R.E.M.
Bill Berry – drums, backing vocals
Peter Buck – guitar, banjo
Mike Mills – bass guitar, backing vocals, piano, pump organ, lead vocals on "Superman"
Michael Stipe – lead vocals, backing vocals on "Superman"

Production
M. Bird – illustrations
Jim Dineen – engineering
Gregg Edward – mixing at Can-Am Recorders, Los Angeles, California, United States
Rick Fetig – engineering
Don Gehman – production, mixing
Ross Hogarth – engineering
Stan Katayama – engineering
Bob Ludwig – mastering, at Masterdisc, New York City, New York, United States
Sandra Lee Phipps – photography
Juanita Rogers – back cover painting
R. O. Scarelli – packaging
B. Slay – illustrations

Chart performance

Weekly charts

Singles

Certifications

Release history

Notes
† I.R.S. Vintage Years edition, with bonus tracks
†† 25th anniversary edition, with bonus disc

References

External links
R.E.M.HQ on Lifes Rich Pageant

 (I.R.S. Vintage Years edition)

 (I.R.S. Vintage Years edition)
Talk About The Pageant: When R.E.M. Came To Bloomington In 1986

1986 albums
Albums produced by Don Gehman
I.R.S. Records albums
R.E.M. albums
Pop rock albums by American artists